PCAS may refer to:

 Palomar Planet-Crossing Asteroid Survey, astronomical survey
 Patient-controlled analgesia methods
 Persistent Close Air Support
 Personal Carbon Allowances, a concept in Personal carbon trading
 Polytechnics Central Admissions System
 Portable Collision Avoidance System
 Postgraduate Certificate in Antarctic Studies at University of Canterbury
 Post-Cardiac Arrest Syndrome